Milovan Drašković (born March 30, 1995) is a Montenegrin professional basketball player. Standing at a height of 2.14 m (7' 0"), Drašković can play at both the power forward and center positions.

Professional career
Drašković spent the 2019–20 season with Pagrati, of the Greek 2nd Division.

National team career
Drašković played with the Under-16, Under-18, and Under-20 junior national teams of Montenegro.

References

External links
Milovan Drašković @ FIBA.com
Milovan Drašković @ ProBallers.com
Milovan Drašković @ RealGM.com
Milovan Drašković @ Eurobasket.com
Milovan Drašković @ InterPerformances.com
Milovan Drašković @ NBADraft.net
Milovan Drašković @ MueveteBasket.es 

1995 births
Living people
Centers (basketball)
FC Barcelona Bàsquet B players
Flyers Wels players
KK Podgorica players
KK Sutjeska players
Montenegrin expatriate basketball people in Greece
Montenegrin expatriate basketball people in Spain
Montenegrin men's basketball players
Pagrati B.C. players
Power forwards (basketball)
Swans Gmunden players
Traiskirchen Lions players